Sara Wüest (born 4 August 1969) is a Swiss athlete who competed in sprinting events. She represented her country at two World Indoor Championships, in 1993 and 1995.

International competitions

Personal bests
Outdoor
100 metres – 11.62 (+0.1 m/s, Zofingen 1996)
200 metres – 23.85 (-0.6 m/s, Zürich 1992)
Indoor
60 metres – 7.37 (Genoa 1992)

References

All-Athletics profile

1969 births
Living people
Swiss female sprinters